Jama Masjid, Pilibhit was constructed by Hafiz Rahmat Khan Barech in 1769. It was modelled on the  Jama Masjid Delhi. The cost of the construction of Jama Masjid in Pilibhit was Rs. 3 lakhs.

The gateway is built in Mughal style, which resembles to the gateways of the Jama Masjid in Delhi, while the wall around the mosque enclosure are reminiscences of the curvilinear Bengali roof found in Shahjahan's additions to the Mughal palace at Agra. Every Friday, a number of Muslims in the city and nearby villages gather to perform the Friday prayer. The part of the building has been destroyed and part of land has been trespassed. A small market is also held on every Tuesday in the Jama Masjid compound. A new Tehsil compound has also been constructed close to Jama Masjid.

Location 
Jama Masjid, Pilibhit is only 3.2 km away from Pilibhit Junction Railway Station and situated in Sarai Khan Area near Ayurvedic College in Pilibhit.

References 

Grand mosques
Mosques in Uttar Pradesh